Georges Banu (22 June 1943 – 21 January 2023) was a Romanian-born French writer, theatre critic, and academic.

Biography
Born in Buzău on 22 June 1943, Banu studied at the Caragiale National University of Theatre and Film. He moved to France in 1973 and became a professor at Sorbonne Nouvelle University Paris 3. He began writing essays on theatre and was notably the author of Théâtre sortie de secours, L'Acteur qui ne revient pas, Notre théâtre, La Cerisaie, L'Homme de dos, and Peter Brook. Vers un théâtre premier.

Banu subsequently became a professor of theatre at the Université catholique de Louvain and was president of the Association internationale des critiques de théâtre from 1994 to 2000. In 1990, he founded the Académie expérimentale des théâtres, which ceased operations in 2001, alongside . He was co-director of the magazine Alternatives théâtrales and director of the Actes Sud collection "Le temps du théâtre".

Banu died on 21 January 2023, at the age of 79.

Publications
Bertolt Brecht ou Le petit contre le grand (1981)
Le Théâtre, sortie de secours (1984)
L'acteur qui ne revient pas : journées de théâtre au Japon (1986)
Mémoires du théâtre (1987)
Le Rouge et l'Or, une poétique du théâtre à l'italienne (1989)
Peter Brook : de Timon d'Athènes à Hamlet (1991)
Le Rideau ou La fêlure du monde (1997)
Avec Brecht (1999)
Notre Théâtre. La Cerisaie (1999)
Les Cités du théâtre d'art : de Stanislavski à Strehler (2000)
L'Homme de dos (2000)
Exercices d'accompagnement : d'Antoine Vitez à Sarah Bernhardt (2002)
Yannis Kokkos : le scénographe et le héron (2004)
La Nuit nécessaire (2004)
Les répétitions : de Stanislavski à aujourd'hui (2005)
L'Oubli (2005)
Nocturnes : peindre la nuit, jouer dans le noir (2005)
La Scène surveillée (2006)
Miniatures théoriques (2008)
Shakespeare, le monde est une scène : métaphores et pratiques théâtrales (2009)
Le Repos (2009)
Des murs... au Mur (2009)
Shakespeare: métaphores et pratiques du théâtre (2010)
Les Voyages du comédien (2012)
Amour et désamour du théâtre (2013)
La porte au cœur de l'intime (2015)
Les Récits d'Horatio : portraits et aveux des maîtres du théâtre européen (2021)

Awards
Medal for Merit to Culture – Gloria Artis (2009)

References

1943 births
2023 deaths
Recipients of the Medal for Merit to Culture – Gloria Artis
Honorary members of the Romanian Academy
Academic staff of the Université catholique de Louvain
People from Buzău